Stacey Elizabeth Pensgen (born May 25, 1982) is an American former competitive figure skater who won the silver medal at the 2000 Four Continents Championships. She is currently the evening meteorologist for WHEC-TV News10NBC in Rochester, New York.

Personal life and education 
Pensgen was born in Fairport, New York. She trained in gymnastics from the age of three until she was fifteen. She was a regional champion in 1994 and 1995.

Pensgen studied at Lahser High School in Bloomfield Hills, Michigan. She later attended Oakland Community College, and the University of Colorado. In 2007, she graduated with a Bachelor of Science degree in meteorology from SUNY Brockport.

Skating career 
Pensgen began skating at the age of six after watching figure skating on television. From 1998, she was coached mainly by Richard Callaghan at the Onyx in Rochester. She was also coached by Mitch Moyer at the Detroit Skating Club in Bloomfield Hills, Michigan. She represented Genesee Figure Skating Club.

Competing in single skating, Pensgen won the bronze medal at the 1999 ISU Junior Grand Prix in Canada and the silver medal at the 2000 Four Continents Championships. Her highest placement at the U.S. Championships was sixth in 2000.

In the 2001–02 season, Pensgen was coached by Callaghan and Sergei Petrovsky in Michigan. In 2003, she trained under Diana Ronayne in Colorado Springs, Colorado.

Pensgen also competed in pair skating. Early in her career, she skated with her brother, Nathan Pensgen. In 2002, she teamed up with Derek Trent and placed 14th at the 2003 U.S. Championships.

Programs

Results

Single skating

Pair skating with Trent

Meteorology and broadcast career

13 WHAM TV 
13 WHAM TV hired Pensgen in August 2006 as a part-time meteorologist and reporter. She quit working at WHAM in January 2011.

WROC-TV News 8 
Pensgen was hired by WROC-TV  News 8 in February 2011. She was the weekend meteorologist for News 8 at 6, and News 8 at 11. She also filled in for former chief meteorologist Scott Hetsko and morning meteorologist John DiPasquale. Pensgen has also done some reporting work for WROC, including "Living Here" segments featuring distinctive small towns in Western New York and "Around Town" segments on weekend events around Rochester, New York. On August 10, 2016, she became the chief meteorologist for WROC-TV News 8 after Scott Hetsko left the station.

WHEC Rochester 10 
The Rochester D&C  announced on July 24, 2019, Pensgen will be moving to WHEC-TV.  Pensgen will join the NBC affiliate the week of Aug. 5, according to a press release from the station. She will make her first on-air appearance Aug.12 and anchor forecasts weekdays at 4, 5, 6, 7 and 11 p.m.

References

External links
 
 Stacey Pensgen's Facebook fan page

American female single skaters
Living people
1982 births
Four Continents Figure Skating Championships medalists
Sportspeople from Rochester, New York
Television meteorologists from New York (state)
Scientists from New York (state)
21st-century American women